Macinley Butson is an inventor and scientist who won the 2018 NSW Young Australian of the Year and 2019 Stockholm Junior Water Prize.

Her inventions gear towards supporting radiotherapy breast cancer patients and ensuring provision of safe drinking water for developing communities. She became a part of BBC 100 Women 2020 because of her contributions and inspirational role in science, technology, engineering, and mathematics and 2020 Forbes 30 Under 30 Asia under Healthcare and Science.

Early life and education 
Butson hails from Wollongong, New South Wales. She began inventing when she was six years old. She attended high school at The Illawarra Grammar School.

Career 
She was 18 years old when she invented the SODIS ultraviolet radiation sticker which tests whether water is safe to drink, a breakthrough that has the potential to save lives from contaminated water. She also invented the SMART Armour which aims to protect breast cancer patients from the effects of excess radiation during their radiotherapy treatment  however is not in use at any hospital to date.

References 

Year of birth missing (living people)
People from Wollongong
21st-century Australian scientists
BBC 100 Women
Living people